Henry Overton Wills III (22 December 1828 – 4 September 1911) of Kelston Knoll, near Bath in Somerset, was a prominent and wealthy member of the Bristol tobacco manufacturing family of Wills which founded the firm of W. D. & H. O. Wills. As a philanthropist his best-known act was the funding of the University of Bristol, founded in 1909, of which he became the first Chancellor.

Origins
He was the eldest of the 18 children of Henry Overton Wills II (1800–1871) by his first wife Isabella Board. He was a first-cousin of William Henry Wills, 1st Baron Winterstoke, the first Chairman of Imperial Tobacco, formed by the merger of the family's original business with twelve other tobacco firms. He was the elder brother of Sir Edward Payson Wills, 1st Baronet (1834–1910) of Hazelwood and Clapton-in-Gordano and of Sir Frederick Wills, 1st Baronet (1838–1909) of Northmoor (father of Gilbert Wills, 1st Baron Dulverton). His younger half-brother was Sir Frank William Wills, Knight, Lord Mayor of Bristol.

Career
Wills entered the family firm of W. D. & H. O. Wills in 1846, but retired from active association with the business in 1880, due to poor health. When the formation of Imperial Tobacco greatly increased the family’s wealth, various members began to contribute significant amounts of money to local causes. The most significant of these was announced in 1908 by his eldest son Sir George Alfred Wills, 1st Baronet (1854–1928), when he read a letter from his father promising £100,000 (about £10 million in today's money) to fund a university at Bristol if a royal charter for the purpose could be obtained within two years. With the charter and further funding quickly obtained, the University of Bristol was founded in 1909 with Henry as its first Chancellor.

Marriage and children

In 1853 at Plymouth in Devon he married Alice Hopkinson (1827–1881), by whom he had issue including:
Sir George Alfred Wills, 1st Baronet (1854–1928), eldest son and heir, of Combe Lodge, Blagdon, Somerset, and of Burwalls, Leigh Woods, Long Ashton, Somerset. He served as managing director and later as president of  Imperial Tobacco. He donated about £135,000 for the creation of a hall of residence at Bristol University and in 1923 was created a Baronet "of Blagdon". Together with his brother Henry Herbert Wills he built the Wills Memorial Building in Bristol in memory of his father.
Henry Herbert Wills (1856–1922), 2nd son, also active in the family tobacco firm of WD & HO Wills;
Walter Melville Wills, 3rd son, also involved with the family tobacco business.
Arthur Stanley Wills (1862–1935), 4th son;
Maitland Wills (died April 1885), killed by a fall in North Wales;
H.O. Wills IV (died October 1899), youngest son.

Death and burial
He died on 4 September 1911 at Kelston Knoll and was buried in Arnos Vale Cemetery in Bristol, where survives his monument, together with many others of the Wills family. His estate was valued at £5,214,821, about £520 million in today's money.

Legacy
The Wills Memorial Building, one of the landmark buildings of Bristol University, was built in Henry's honour by his sons George and Harry. One of the Wills' family homes, Downside House in Bristol, is now a hall of residence known as Wills Hall for the university.

Arms

References

External links
 Obituary in The Times

1828 births
1911 deaths
Businesspeople from Bristol
Chancellors of the University of Bristol
Henry Overton III